Karafuto Shrine (樺太神社, Karafuto jinja) was a Shinto shrine in Toyohara, Karafuto Prefecture in what is now Sakhalin Oblast, Russia.

The shrine was established in 1911, and its main annual festival was held on August 23. Kami enshrined here included Okunitama no kami (大国魂神), Ōkuninushi (as 大己貴神) and Sukunabikona (少彦名命).

It was formerly a national shrine of the first rank (国幣大社, kokuhei taisha) in the Modern system of ranked Shinto Shrines.

The Karafuto Shrine was abandoned in 1945 due to the Soviet takeover of the island, and it was demolished on November 17. The modern site of the shrine has a concrete building, with a commemorative plaque to mark Japanese-Russian relations. Next to the shrine's site is a Western-style boarding school.

See also
Nishikubo Shrine
Kanpei-taisha

References

Shinto shrines in Karafuto Prefecture
Buildings and structures demolished in 1945
Religious buildings and structures completed in 1911
20th-century Shinto shrines